"I Ran (So Far Away)", also released as "I Ran", is a song by English new wave band A Flock of Seagulls. It was released in 1982 as their third single and it was the second single from their self-titled debut album. It topped the chart in Australia, and reached number seven in New Zealand and number nine in the United States, although it failed to make the top 40 in the band's home country (United Kingdom). However, the song was certified silver by the BPI.

In an article for Rolling Stone titled, Anglomania: The Second British Invasion, Parke Puterbaugh wrote of the impact of the song's music video on its US chart success, "Fronted by a singer-synth player with a haircut stranger than anything you'd be likely to encounter in a month of poodle shows, A Flock of Seagulls struck gold on the first try."

Recording and composition
Lead vocalist Mike Score says that there were two main sources of inspiration for "I Ran (So Far Away)". The members of A Flock of Seagulls would regularly visit Eric's Club in Liverpool, where one of the bands had a song called "I Ran". Score noted that because A Flock of Seagulls would rehearse right after returning from Eric's, the song title and chorus may have gotten stuck in his head. Another idea came from a poster at a Zoo Records office. The band had gone there with the intent of securing a recording contract, and they wanted to use the poster, which featured a man and a woman running away from a flying saucer, as the cover for their first album, A Flock of Seagulls (1982). This depiction also helped spark the song's unusual space-like lyrics.

"I Ran (So Far Away)" was recorded at Battery Studios in London with producer Mike Howlett. It is a new wave and synth-pop song, with a run time of five minutes and seven seconds. According to the sheet music, the song moves at a quick tempo of 145 beats per minute. With a chord progression of A-G-A-G in the verses and F-G-A in the choruses, the song is written in the key of A minor. During the song's introduction and musical interludes, short guitar riffs are played, which make use of echo. Guitarist Paul Reynolds had joined the band after the music was already written, so the short guitar riffs were added for Reynolds to play. Lyrically, "I Ran (So Far Away)" is about a man who sees an attractive woman and attempts to run away from his feelings. Before this happens, the man sees an aurora in the sky, and he and the woman are abducted by aliens.

Track listing
7" Jive VS 102 (US) – 1982

12" Jive T14 (UK) – 1982

CD August Day 40 (UK) – 2018

Single release and legacy
The single was promoted by a distinctive music video directed by Tony van den Ende in which the band members performed in a room covered in aluminium foil and mirrors. The cameras used to film the video are clearly visible in many of the background reflections, their stands also covered in foil. The video is an homage to Brian Eno and Robert Fripp's (No Pussyfooting) album cover, which was also portrayed by the Strokes in the video for their single, "The End Has No End," two decades later. The video received heavy rotation on MTV in the summer of 1982, and helped the single to become a hit.

With its abbreviated title and beginning of its chorus matching the American English pronunciation of Iran, the song was heard by Americans as "punningly political at a time when Iran itself was making headlines around the clock". The song, the music video, and the band were an "irresistible" package for American audiences, and by the summer of 1982, "America was clutching A Flock of Seagulls to its heart". According to Maz Jobrani, the release of the song was a "disaster" for Iranian-American children like himself (then 10 years old). They were cruelly teased by other American children with the song's misheard chorus: "I-ran, I-ran so far away."

The band toured the United States extensively to promote the single, supporting Squeeze on their 1982 tour. As well as reaching number 9 on the Billboard Hot 100, "I Ran" peaked at number 3 on the Top Tracks chart and number 8 on the Hot Dance Club Play chart. Subsequently, the album reached number 10 on the Billboard 200.

In the VH1 special 100 Greatest Songs of the '80s, "I Ran" was listed at No. 55 on the countdown, while on the VH1 special 100 Greatest One-Hit Wonders of the 80s, the song was listed at No. 2.

Although considered a 1980s new wave classic, the song experienced something of a revival in 2002 as the signature theme for the video game Grand Theft Auto: Vice City, being played during the game's television commercials and during gameplay as one of the songs in the playlist for radio station Wave 103.

The song's apparent references to Iran were highlighted again in the fall of 2007, when the long-running American television show Saturday Night Live ran a parody version of the song that expressly mocked current Iranian policies like Holocaust denial.

Charts and certifications

Weekly charts

Year-end charts

Certifications

See also
List of number-one singles in Australia during the 1980s

References

1982 songs
1982 singles
A Flock of Seagulls songs
Jive Records singles
Number-one singles in Australia
Song recordings produced by Mike Howlett